"Diamond in the Back" is the fifth and final single released from the album Chicken-n-Beer by Ludacris. It is based on William DeVaughn's "Be Thankful for What You Got" and samples it heavily in the southern chopped & screwed format. It was produced by DJ Paul & Juicy J of Three 6 Mafia. This was Ludacris's first single to not hit the Billboard Hot 100's Top 40 and the Billboard Hot R&B/Hip-Hop Singles & Tracks's Top 20. The music video is directed in Atlanta, and features cameo appearances by Lil Duval, Atlanta based comedian Shawty, members of Ludacris' Disturbing the Peace label Shawnna, I-20, Bobby V, Tity Boi, David Banner and the producer duo of DJ Paul and Juicy J.

Performance
"Diamond in the Back" peaked on the Billboard Hot 100 at #94. On the Hot Rap/R&B chart it reached #51. Lupe Fiasco has also freestyled over this instrumental.

Chart positions

Composers
 Beauregard, 
 P./Devaughn, 
 W./Houston, 
 J./Bridges, C.
 R./Moody,

Release history

References

External links
 

2003 songs
2004 singles
Ludacris songs
Songs written by Ludacris
Def Jam Recordings singles
Songs written by DJ Paul
Songs written by Juicy J